The Hailang River is a left-bank tributary of the Mudan River in Northeast China. It starts from Haiyuan Tree Farm, Dunhua, Jilin Province, runs 222.3 kilometres through Hailin City and empties into the Mudan River at southwestern Mudanjiang City. The lower course of the Hailang River is fertile soil and ample products in Hailin City.

References

Rivers of Heilongjiang
Rivers of Jilin